Hydrangea ringspot virus (HRSV) is a plant pathogenic virus of the family Alphaflexiviridae.

External links
ICTVdB - The Universal Virus Database: Hydrangea ringspot virus
Family Groups - The Baltimore Method

Potexviruses
Viral plant pathogens and diseases